Francesco Canella (born January 28, 1939 in Noventa di Piave) is a retired Italian professional football player.

Honours
 Serie A champion: 1964/65, 1965/66.

1939 births
Living people
Italian footballers
Serie A players
Serie B players
Serie D players
Venezia F.C. players
Udinese Calcio players
ACF Fiorentina players
Inter Milan players
Genoa C.F.C. players
Calcio Lecco 1912 players
A.C. Belluno 1905 players
Footballers from Veneto
Association football forwards
Sportspeople from the Metropolitan City of Venice